Freudenbergite is a mineral that is named in honor of Wilhelm Freudenberg, palaeontologist at the University of Tübingen and the University of Göttingen, and curator for mineralogy and geology at the National Collections of Natural History in Karlsruhe. He studied Katzenbuckel rocks.

Naturally occurring freudenbergite is a solid solution of two end members Na2Fe +32Ti6O16 and Na2Fe +2Ti7O16, which were referred to as low-Ti and high-Ti freudenbergite, respectively Both varieties were found in the course of close examination of samples from the Katzenbuckel Complex, Germany, in which this mineral was documented for the first time  As a possible mineral Fe2+ analog was named UM1983-07-O:FeNaTi 

Monoclinic with straight extinction and high birefringence. Brown.

Synthetic freudenbergite was crystallized during the lamprophyllite incongruity melting.

References

Bibliography
Haggerty, S.E. (1983): A freudenbergite-related mineral in granulites from a kimberlite in Liberia, West Africa. Neues Jahrb. Mineral. Monatsch.: 375-384; in: Dunn, P.J., Cabri, L.J., Ferraiolo, J.A., Grice, J.D., Jambor, J.L., Mueller, W., Shigley, J.E., Puziewicz, J., Vanko, D.A. (1984): New mineral names. American Mineralogist: 69: 1194

Mineral. 69, 834–847 (1984).

Smith, D.G.W., Nickel, E.H. (2007): A System of Codification for Unnamed Minerals: Report of the SubCommittee for Unnamed Minerals of the IMA Commission on New Minerals, Nomenclature and Classification. Canadian Mineralogist: 45: 983-1055; http://nrmima.nrm.se(2016)

Taylor L. A. and  PokhilenkoN., “Ferrous freudenbergite in ilmenite megacrysts: a unique paragenesis from the Dalnaya Kimberlite, Yakutia,” Am. Mineral. 82, 991– 1000 (1997).

Zaitsev, V. A., Kogarko, L. N. and Senin, V. G. (2013) ‘Phase equilibria in the system lamprophyllite-nepheline’, Geochemistry International, 51(11), pp. 889–895.

Minerals